Andy "Red Spyda" Thelusma is an American hip hop producer who has worked on many songs for artists including 50 Cent, D-Block, Mobb Deep, Amerie, D12, and G-Unit. Other notable works by Red Spyda have included his contributions to the in-game soundtrack of Grand Theft Auto III. He produced background music for the game's fictional radio station Game FM (the name is derived from Game Recordings; several of the hip-hop label's artists such as Royce da 5'9" appeared on the radio station). He also has production credits in the game for two freestyles and previously released songs featured in the game under his less commonly used alias, Rush.

Production credits

References

1975 births
Living people
Record producers from Florida
American hip hop record producers